Ramiro Castillo Salinas (March 27, 1966 – October 18, 1997) was a Bolivian footballer that played as a midfielder. He was capped 52 times and scored 5 international goals for Bolivia between 1989 and 1997. He made one substitute appearance at the 1994 FIFA World Cup.

Club career
Nicknamed "Chocolatín" by the colour of his skin, Castillo was born in Coripata, a small town in the sub-tropical Yungas region. His first professional team was The Strongest, the club with which he always identified. From there he went to play successfully in Argentine football, defending the colors of Instituto de Córdoba, Argentinos Juniors, River Plate, Rosario Central and Platense. He set a record for the most appearances in the Argentine league by a Bolivian player with 145 games, also scoring 10 goals in Argentina too.

Later in his career he returned to Bolivia where he played for The Strongest and Club Bolívar.

International career
Castillo represented his country in 13 FIFA World Cup qualification matches and he played at the 1997 Copa América, where he scored a goal in the semi-final against Mexico national football team. Bolivia were runners-up after losing 1–3 in the final against Brazil. Castillo missed the final game due to the sudden death of his 7-year-old son José Manuel to fulminating hepatitis. His son died two days later.

Death
Castillo never recovered from his son's death and committed suicide by hanging himself in his home in La Paz in October 1997. He was only 31 years old and was survived by his wife María del Carmen Crespo and their children.

The Bolivian football association announced a month of mourning after his death, and the derby game between his former clubs The Strongest and  Bolívar was postponed. In Argentina there was a minutes silence at the game between his former club Platense and Gimnasia de Jujuy where the players wore black armbands.

References

External links
 Argentine Primera statistics at Fútbol XXI  
 
 Article on the 10 year anniversary of his death 

1966 births
1997 suicides
Afro-Bolivian people
People from Nor Yungas Province
Bolivian footballers
Association football midfielders
Bolivia international footballers
Bolivian expatriate footballers
1994 FIFA World Cup players
1989 Copa América players
1991 Copa América players
1993 Copa América players
1997 Copa América players
Bolivian Primera División players
Argentine Primera División players
The Strongest players
Instituto footballers
Argentinos Juniors footballers
Club Atlético River Plate footballers
Rosario Central footballers
Club Atlético Platense footballers
Everton de Viña del Mar footballers
Club Bolívar players
Expatriate footballers in Argentina
Expatriate footballers in Chile
Bolivian expatriate sportspeople in Argentina
Bolivian expatriate sportspeople in Chile
Suicides by hanging in Bolivia